Dušan Bartovič (4 March 1944 – 1 April 2020) was a Slovak footballer. He competed in the men's tournament at the 1968 Summer Olympics. He won two caps for the Czechoslovakia national football team.

References

External links
 

1944 births
2020 deaths
Slovak footballers
Czechoslovak footballers
Czechoslovakia international footballers
Olympic footballers of Czechoslovakia
Footballers at the 1968 Summer Olympics
People from Piešťany District
Sportspeople from the Trnava Region
Association football midfielders
TTS Trenčín players